The Long–Allen Bridge (named for Louisiana Governors Huey Long and Oscar K. Allen) was a two-lane swing bridge carrying U.S. Route 84 (US 84) across the Black River at Jonesville, Louisiana in Concordia Parish. It was replaced by a larger bridge in 2009. The newer structure carries 4 lanes of traffic and was built at a cost of $8,610,000.

See also
 
 
 
 Long–Allen Bridge (disambiguation) for other bridges named for the same two governors

References

Truss bridges in the United States
Bridges completed in 1933
Road bridges in Louisiana
U.S. Route 84
Bridges of the United States Numbered Highway System
Buildings and structures in Concordia Parish, Louisiana